The 69 Class designed by William Dean for the Great Western Railway consisted of eight  tender locomotives, constructed at Swindon Works between 1895 and 1897. Nominally they were renewals of eight  engines that carried the same numbers, these themselves having been renewals by George Armstrong at Wolverhampton of s designed by Daniel Gooch as long ago as 1855.

In truth the Dean engines were in effect new engines, the only re-used parts being some recently fitted boilers of Swindon pattern. They had  driving wheels and  cylinders. s, being mixed-traffic engines, were not usually named on the GWR, but all of the 69s did carry names, as follows:

 69 Avon
 70 Dart
 71 Dee
 72 Exe
 73 Isis
 74 Stour
 75 Teign
 76 Wye

The "Rivers" were originally allocated to Oxford, and later moved to the Bristol division. They were not long-lived as s, the last being withdrawn in 1918.

References

Sources
 
 

2-4-0 locomotives
River Class
Railway locomotives introduced in 1895
Standard gauge steam locomotives of Great Britain
Scrapped locomotives